Migrant hostels of South Australia — are hostels where thousands of migrants passed from the 1940s to the 1980s. In South Australia these included Elder Park, Gawler, Gepps Cross, Glenelg, Hendon, Mallala, Pennington/Finsbury, Peterborough, Rosewater, Salisbury, Semaphore, Smithfield, Willaston, Whyalla, Woodside and Woodville. The hostels were temporary homes to a wide range of migrants, from Displaced Persons and refugees, through to "Ten Pound Poms".

History 
Post war immigration to Australia contributed significantly to the population of South Australia. This was the era of "populate or perish" and the Federal Government sought to increase the population of Australia by campaigns to encourage, through "assisted passage" schemes, migrants from the United Kingdom. However insufficient Britons took up the opportunity and so Australia opened its doors to more migrants from non-British sources.

A war-devastated Europe provided a huge source of migrants. However Australians, accustomed to pro-British and "White Australia" policies were initially wary of non-British looking migrants. When these barriers had been overcome to some degree, the "New Australians" arrived in large numbers. Many migrants came to South Australia.

All the migrants, no matter where they came from, needed to be temporarily accommodated until they obtained employment and accommodation. Hence migrant hostels were created. These sometimes consisted of clusters of World War 2 Nissen huts. Others may have been vacant government buildings once used for other purposes (e.g. former army barracks, "Cheer Up" entertainment huts from the World Wars).

Sometimes these hostels were located in cheaper industrial suburbs. The Federal Government considered that it was not bound by State health inspection and pricing regulations. Living conditions in the hostels were basic and the cause of dissatisfaction at times. For example, a rent strike and protest occurred at the Finsbury Hostel in Adelaide in 1952. This strike spread to hotels in other states.

Elder Park Hostel 

Located on the site of the present Festival Theatre, at Elder Park, near the River Torrens. It consisted of fibro buildings. Some of the English migrants who migrated under the South Australian Housing Trust's House Purchase Scheme were accommodated for a few weeks before selecting their house for purchase at Elizabeth the SAHT-built satellite town.

Gepps Cross Hostel 

This hostel was located on the corner of Main North Road and Grand Junction Road, diagonally opposite from the Gepps Cross Hotel. It consisted of Nissen huts, each divided to accommodate 2 families.

Woodside Hostel 

Woodside Hostel was an army camp in the Adelaide Hills and accommodation was in wooden huts.

Glenelg Hostel 

Glenelg Hostel opened in 1949 just south of the new Adelaide airport site. It closed in 1973. The hostel consisted of Nissen huts. One Nissen hut still stands and is now used as storage.

Pennington Hostel 

Pennington Hostel was established by the Commonwealth Migrant Workers Accommodation Division in 1950 and was located on Grand Junction Road, between Addison Road and Glenroy Street. It consisted of converted army Nissen huts and sheds. Migrants could stay there for up to five years. It was also known as Finsbury Hostel. The hostel closed in November 1985.

Peterborough Hostel 

Peterborough Hostel was established by South Australian Railways in about 1948 to house unmarried immigrant men who worked at the railway workshops. It was located on the edge of town, near the workshops. It consisted of Nissen huts and sheds and operated until the 1970s.

Rosewater Hostel 

Rosewater Hostel was near Port Adelaide and consisted of big  woolsheds divided up into rows of cubicles inside, with wire mesh ceilings.

Smithfield Hostel 

From 1949 until 1971 Smithfield Migrant Hostel was home to many migrants. Situated on Section 3163, in the Hundred of Munno Para, the hostel accommodated up to 300 people at one time. It was in a former army ordnance depot between Coventry Road and the Gawler railway line. Accommodation was provided free of charge until the breadwinner of the family found work and then there would be a charge. After twelve months a special application was required if the family wished to stay on. The hostel closed when the Commonwealth Migration Programme slowed and new migrants could be given accommodation at Pennington.

References 

History of South Australia
Migrant hostels in Australia